Roxana-Iuliana Anghel (born 1 January 1998) is a Romanian rower. She competed in the women's coxless four event at the 2020 Summer Olympics.

References

External links
 

1998 births
Living people
Romanian female rowers
Olympic rowers of Romania
Rowers at the 2020 Summer Olympics
People from Câmpulung Moldovenesc